The 2017–18 Premier League Tournament was the 30th season of first-class cricket in Sri Lanka's Premier Trophy, with the matches played across three days each in the group stage. Chilaw Marians Cricket Club won the tournament, after finishing unbeaten in the Super Eight section of the competition.

The tournament started on 8 December 2017 and concluded on 18 February 2018, with fourteen teams competing, split into two groups of seven. The top four teams in each group progressed to the Super Eight part of the tournament, with those matches played across four days. The teams that did not qualify for the Super Eight round competed in the Plate Championships.

Galle Cricket Club finished with the fewest points in the previous tournament and were replaced by Sri Lanka Ports Authority Cricket Club for this edition of the competition, following their promotion from Tier B. Sinhalese Sports Club were the defending champions.

In December 2017, the match between Chilaw Marians Cricket Club and Burgher Recreation Club finished as a tie. In January 2018, the Plate League match between Bloomfield Cricket and Athletic Club and Sri Lanka Army Sports Club also finished as a tie. Chilaw Marians Cricket Club won the tournament, after remaining unbeaten throughout the competition. Bloomfield Cricket and Athletic Club finished bottom of the Plate Group and were relegated to Tier B.

Following the conclusion of the Premier League Tournament, the 2017–18 Super Four Provincial Tournament took place, featuring four teams based on the Centers of Excellence in Sri Lanka. In February 2019, Sri Lanka Cricket named Kaushal Silva as the tournament's Best Batsman, Chanaka Komasaru as the Best Bowler and Sachithra Serasinghe as the Player of the Tournament.

Teams
The following teams competed:

Group A
 Bloomfield Cricket and Athletic Club
 Colombo Cricket Club
 Colts Cricket Club
 Moors Sports Club
 Ragama Cricket Club
 Saracens Sports Club
 Sinhalese Sports Club

Group B
 Badureliya Sports Club
 Burgher Recreation Club
 Chilaw Marians Cricket Club
 Nondescripts Cricket Club
 Sri Lanka Army Sports Club
 Sri Lanka Ports Authority Cricket Club
 Tamil Union Cricket and Athletic Club

Points table

Group A

 Team qualified for the Super Eight

Group B

 Team qualified for the Super Eight

Super Eight

 Champions

Plate League

 Relegated to Tier B

Group stage

Group A

Round 1

Round 2

Round 3

Round 4

Round 5

Round 6

Round 7

Group B

Round 1

Round 2

Round 3

Round 4

Round 5

Round 6

Round 7

Plate League

Super Eight

See also
 2017–18 Premier League Tournament Tier B
 List of tied first-class cricket matches

References

External links
 Series home at ESPN Cricinfo

Premier League Tournament
Premier League Tournament
Premier League Tournament